This is a list of pansexual characters in fiction, i.e. characters that identify as pansexual or are identified by outside parties to be pansexual. Pansexuality is the sexual, romantic or emotional attraction towards people regardless of their biological sex or gender identity. While pansexuality is at times viewed as a sexual orientation in its own right, at other times it's viewed as a branch of bisexuality, to indicate an alternative sexual identity.

This list contains characters across various forms of media that are pansexual, listed in alphabetical order by surname in each section. In the case where characters are identified with only a single name (either first or last) or by a title, that is used instead. To be listed here, characters have to either state in-universe that they are bisexual, be identified as such by either someone involved in the work they appear in, or a reliable, third-party source.

The names are organized alphabetically by surname (i.e. last name), or by single name if the character does not have a surname.

Animated series

Film

Live-action television

Video games

Graphic art and webcomics

See also

 List of animated series with LGBT characters
 List of fictional polyamorous characters
 List of fictional non-binary characters
 List of fictional lesbian characters
 List of fictional asexual characters
 List of fictional intersex characters
 List of fictional trans characters
 List of fictional bisexual characters
 List of fictional gay characters
 List of comedy television series with LGBT characters
 List of dramatic television series with LGBT characters: 1970s–2000s
 List of dramatic television series with LGBT characters: 2010s
 List of made-for-television films with LGBT characters
 List of LGBT characters in soap operas
 List of LGBT characters in television and radio

Notes

References

Pansexual
Pansexual